William Mercer Owens Dawson (May 21, 1853March 12, 1916) was the 12th Governor of West Virginia, serving from 1905 until 1909. A member of the Republican Party, he also served as Secretary of State of West Virginia from 1897 until 1905.

External links
 Biography of William M. O. Dawson
 Inaugural Address of William M. O. Dawson

Republican Party governors of West Virginia
People from Preston County, West Virginia
Secretaries of State of West Virginia
1853 births
1916 deaths
19th-century American politicians
20th-century American politicians